Jenico William Joseph Preston, 14th Viscount Gormanston,  (1 June 1837 – 29 October 1907), was an aristocratic Anglo-Irish colonial administrator.

Born at Gormanston Castle, County Meath, he was the elder son and heir of Edward Preston, 13th Viscount Gormanston, by his wife Lucretia, daughter of William Charles Jerningham, brother of the 8th Baron Stafford.

He was commissioned into the 60th King's Royal Rifle Corps in 1855, and served as a Lieutenant during the Indian Rebellion of 1857, before retiring from the British Army in 1860.

As the Hon. Jenico Preston he served as High Sheriff of County Dublin (1865), County Meath (1871) before being appointed Chamberlain to the Lord Lieutenant of Ireland, the Marquess of Abercorn KG, between 1866 and 1868. He succeeded his father in the viscountcy in 1876, having entered the House of Lords under the subsidiary title of Baron Gormanston, created for his father in the Peerage of the United Kingdom in 1868.

In 1885 Gormanston was appointed Governor of the Leeward Islands, a post he held until 1887, and then served as Governor of British Guiana from 1887 to 1893 and as Governor of Tasmania from 1893 to 1900. 

Appointed KCMG in 1887, he was promoted GCMG in 1897.

Lord Gormanston married firstly the Hon. Ismay Louisa Ursula Bellew, daughter of Patrick, 1st Baron Bellew, in 1861; they had no children. After his first wife's death in 1875, he married secondly Georgina Jane Connellan, daughter of Major Peter Connellan, in 1878; they had three sons and one daughter.
 
Lord Gormanston died at Dublin in October 1907, aged 70, and was succeeded in his titles by his eldest son Jenico Edward Joseph Preston, 15th Viscount Gormanston.

See also
 Peerage of Ireland
 List of Knights and Dames Grand Cross of the Order of St Michael and St George

Notes

Further reading
Kidd, Charles, Williamson, David (editors). Debrett's Peerage and Baronetage (2019 edition). 

1837 births
1907 deaths
19th-century Irish people
20th-century Irish people
Irish soldiers
People from County Meath
King's Royal Rifle Corps officers
British military personnel of the Indian Rebellion of 1857
Governors of the Leeward Islands
Governors of Tasmania
Governors of British Guiana
High Sheriffs of Meath
High Sheriffs of County Dublin
Viscounts in the Peerage of Ireland
Knights Grand Cross of the Order of St Michael and St George
Colony of Tasmania people